Jörg Siebenhandl (born 18 January 1990) is an Austrian professional footballer who plays as a goalkeeper for Austrian Bundesliga club Sturm Graz and the Austria national team.

Club career
After his contract with SC Wiener Neustadt had expired in summer 2014, Siebenhandl was without a club until he rejoined his first youth club Admira Wacker in November 2014. He signed a contract until 2017 and served as an emergency man for injured regular goalkeeper Andreas Leitner. In the summer of 2016 he moved to German 2. Bundesliga club Würzburger Kickers. Siebenhandl made his debut for his new side in a DFB-Pokal defeat to 1860 Munich on 25 October 2016.

On 9 May 2018, Siebenhandl played as Sturm Graz beat Red Bull Salzburg in extra time to win the 2017–18 Austrian Cup.

International career 
He made a debut for the Austria national football team on 27 March 2018 in a 4–0 win against Luxembourg.

Honours
Sturm Graz
 Austrian Cup: 2017–18

References

External links
 
 
 OFB Profile

1990 births
Living people
Austrian footballers
Footballers from Vienna
Association football goalkeepers
Austria international footballers
Austria under-21 international footballers
Austrian Football Bundesliga players
2. Bundesliga players
FK Austria Wien players
SV Wienerberger players
SC Wiener Neustadt players
FC Admira Wacker Mödling players
Würzburger Kickers players
SK Sturm Graz players